Commodity management is the process of developing a systematic approach to the entire usage cycle for a group of items.
The term is often used interchangeably with category management.

It is generally considered as one aspect of the procurement management toolkit, and frequently used in combination with other tools – such as 'two-by-four-box' analysis, looking at the strategic positioning of that commodity with respect to an organisation and its supplier. This may then be further developed with supplier relationship management (SRM), with designated buyers managing key suppliers in given commodities.

See also 
Commodity management is also used in other contexts, as such managing dwindling availability of scarce resources. For this context, please see:
 Resource management

References 

Procurement